The 2000 German Open was a women's tennis event that was played in Berlin, Germany from 8 May to 14 May 2000. It was one of two Tier I events that took place on red clay in the build-up to the second Grand Slam of the year, the French Open. Third-seeded Conchita Martínez won the singles title and earned $166,000 first-prize money.

Finals

Singles

 Conchita Martínez defeated  Amanda Coetzer 6–1, 6–2

Doubles

 Conchita Martínez /  Arantxa Sanchez-Vicario defeated  Amanda Coetzer /  Corina Morariu 3–6, 6–2, 7–6(9–7)

Prize money

External links
 ITF tournament edition details
 Tournament draws

Qatar Telecom German Open
Berlin
WTA German Open